Zion Presbyterian Church is  a historic church in Clarkson, Nebraska that is significant "as the first Czech Presbyterian Church in Nebraska and one of a very few in this section of the country".  It was designed by a Czech architect named M.D. Flechor and was built during 1887–88.

It was added to the National Register of Historic Places in 1988.  Its NRHP nomination asserts that its architecture expresses the Czech national spirit.

References

External links 
More photos of the Zion Presbyterian Church at Wikimedia Commons

Czech-American culture in Nebraska
Presbyterian churches in Nebraska
Churches on the National Register of Historic Places in Nebraska
Churches completed in 1888
Buildings and structures in Colfax County, Nebraska
1888 establishments in Nebraska
National Register of Historic Places in Colfax County, Nebraska